

Notable alumni

Nobel prize laureates

Of UTokyo winners, five have been physicists, one chemists, two for literature, one for physiology or medicine and one for efforts towards peace.

Yasunari Kawabata, Literature, 1968
Leo Esaki, Physics, 1973
Eisaku Satō, Peace, 1974
Kenzaburō Ōe, Literature, 1994
Masatoshi Koshiba, Physics, 2002
Yoichiro Nambu, Physics, 2008
Ei-ichi Negishi, Chemistry, 2010
Takaaki Kajita, Physics, 2015
Yoshinori Ohsumi, Physiology or Medicine, 2016
Syukuro Manabe, Physics, 2021

In addition, Shin'ichirō Tomonaga and Satoshi Ōmura have obtained a UTokyo doctorate degree through dissertation review, but have never been educated in UTokyo and are not alumni.

Prime Ministers
Hara Takashi (1918–1921)
Katō Takaaki (1924–1926)
Wakatsuki Reijirō (1926-1927, 1931-1931)
Osachi Hamaguchi (1929–1931)
Kōki Hirota (1936–1937)
Fumimaro Konoe (1937–1939, 1940–1941)
Hiranuma Kiichirō (1939-1939)
Kijūrō Shidehara (1945–1946)
Shigeru Yoshida (吉田茂) (1946–1947, 1948–1954)
Tetsu Katayama (1947–1948)
Hitoshi Ashida (1948-1948)
Ichirō Hatoyama (1954–1956)
Nobusuke Kishi (岸信介) (1957–1960)
Eisaku Satō  (佐藤栄作), Nobel laureate (1964–1972)
Takeo Fukuda (福田赳夫)  (1976–1978)
Yasuhiro Nakasone  (中曽根康弘) (1982–1987)
Kiichi Miyazawa (宮沢喜一)  (1991–1993)
Yukio Hatoyama (鳩山由紀夫)  (2009–2010)

Mathematicians
Tadatoshi Akiba
Kiyoshi Itō
Kenkichi Iwasawa
Tosio Kato
Kunihiko Kodaira, Fields Medal winner
Shoshichi Kobayashi
Mitio Nagumo
Narutaka Ozawa
Mikio Sato
Goro Shimura
Teiji Takagi
Yutaka Taniyama
Kentaro Yano
Kōsaku Yosida

Medical researchers
Akito Arima
Leo Esaki, Nobel laureate
Chūshirō Hayashi
Noriko Kamakura
Jun Kondo
Masatoshi Koshiba, Nobel laureate
Ryogo Kubo
Moi Meng Ling
Hantaro Nagaoka
Ukichiro Nakaya
Yoichiro Nambu, Nobel laureate
Yoshio Nishina
Seiji Ogawa, discoverer of fMRI
Fumio Takei
Shohé Tanaka
Morikazu Toda
Yoji Totsuka
Toshifumi Yokota

Chemists
Kikunae Ikeda
Hiroshi Nishihara
Umetaro Suzuki
Jōkichi Takamine

Physicians
Kunie Miyaji, pioneering woman physician in Japan
Kitasato Shibasaburō
Katsusaburo Yamagiwa

Architects
Arata Isozaki, Royal Gold Medal laureate
Toyo Ito, Pritzker Prize laureate, Royal Gold Medal laureate
Kisho Kurokawa, architect
Fumihiko Maki, Pritzker Prize laureate
Kenzo Tange, Pritzker Prize laureate
Yoshikazu Uchida, main architect behind Hongo campus after the Great Kanto earthquake in 1923.
, architect, central figure of the project of constructing National Diet Building as a bureaucrat of Ministry of Finance

Authors
Kōbō Abe
Ryūnosuke Akutagawa
Osamu Dazai
Shinichi Hoshi
Otohiko Kaga
Yasunari Kawabata, Nobel laureate
Yukio Mishima
Dhan Gopal Mukerji
Atsushi Nakajima
Wafu Nishijima, Zen Buddhist priest
Kenzaburō Ōe, Nobel laureate
Mori Ōgai
Hiro Sachiya
Tatsuhiko Shibusawa
Naoya Shiga
Masaoka Shiki
Natsume Sōseki
Jun'ichirō Tanizaki
Kunio Yanagita

Entertainers
Toshiya Fujita, film director
Bai Guang, one of the seven great singing stars of China
Teruyuki Kagawa, actor
Tokiko Kato, singer
Rei Kikukawa, actress
Tamayo Marukawa, TV announcer
Towa Oshima, manga artist
Kenji Ozawa, musician
Nam June Paik, video artist
Koichi Sugiyama, music composer
Isao Takahata, anime director
Mayuko Takata, actress
Kiyohiko Ushihara, film director
Yoji Yamada, film director
Yoshishige Yoshida, film director
Anton Wicky, educator

Others

Tadatoshi Akiba, Mayor of Hiroshima
Naohiro Amaya, head of the Ministry of International Trade and Industry (MITI)
Inokuchi Ariya, founder of Ebara Corporation
Fang Chih, Statesman, 1923
Toshihiko Fukui, Governor of the Bank of Japan
Minoru Harada, Buddhist leader, 6th President of Soka Gakkai
Mantarō Hashimoto, linguist and sinologist
Keizō Hayashi, General officer, first Chairman of the Joint Staff Council since Japan Self-Defense Forces' establishment.
Ong Iok-tek, linguist
Kanō Jigorō, creator of judo
Takashi Kawamura, 9th President of Hitachi
Furuichi Kōi
Hirata Tosuke, was a Japanese statesman and Lord Keeper of the Privy Seal of Japan, active in the Meiji and Taishō period Empire of Japan.
Akihiko Kumashiro, politician, three-time member of the House of Representatives of Japan
Susumu Kuno, linguist, Professor Emeritus at Harvard University
Kiyozawa Manshi, Buddhist thinker
Peng Ming-min, DPP Senior Advisor to President Chen Shui-Bian; former president of WUFI
Shinrokuro Miyoshi (三好晋六郎)
Tsunetaro Moriyama, Hall of Fame baseball pitcher
Toshirō Mutō, Deputy Governor of the Bank of Japan
Makoto Nakajima, former Commissioner of the Japan Patent Office
Yoshiro Nakamatsu, inventor
Hiroaki Nakanishi (MS 1979), President of Hitachi
John Nathan, translator, first American admitted as a regular student
Kitaro Nishida, philosopher
Namihei Odaira, entrepreneur and philanthropist, founder of Hitachi
Masaharu Ōhashi, Justice of the Supreme Court of Japan
Hisashi Owada, International Court of Justice Judge
Masako Owada, Crown Princess of Japan
Daisetz Teitaro Suzuki, Buddhist scholar
Toshizō Ido, Japanese politician, 52nd Governor of Hyōgo Prefecture
Takejirō Tokonami, government minister and governor
Eiji Toyoda, industrialist
Kazuhide Uekusa, economist
Hidesaburō Ueno, agricultural scientist and owner of world's most loyal dog, Hachiko
Yoichi Wada, president of Square Enix
Toshizo Ido, Governor of Hyogo prefecture 
Tetsuro Watsuji, philosopher
Charles Dickinson West, mechanical engineer
Akira Yanabu, researcher in translation and comparative literature
 Toshiki Sumitani, President, Kobe Institute of Computing
Hakuo Yanagisawa, politician, Minister of Health, Labour and Welfare
Takashi Yuasa, lawyer, economist
Hayato Sumino, pianist 
Makoto Soejima, competitive programmer
Shigeaki Sugeta, linguist

References

See also 
University of Tokyo

Tokyo, University of
University
List